Law reports covering the decisions of Australian Courts are collections of decisions by particulars courts, subjects or jurisdictions. A widely used guide to case citation in Australia is the Australian Guide to Legal Citation, published jointly by the Melbourne University Law Review and the Melbourne Journal of International Law.

List of Law Reports in Australia
 
Australian law-related lists